Buston may refer to:

Buston, Mastchoh District, a town in northern Tajikistan
Buston, Shahriston District, a village in northern Tajikistan
Buston, Sughd, a city in northern Tajikistan
High Buston,  a small hamlet on the Northumberland coast of England situated between Alnmouth and Warkworth 
Buton Rinchen Drub, often (Bu-ston), an early Tibetan scholar

See also

Boston (disambiguation)
Buxton (disambiguation)